David Hill is a British actor. He was born in Skipton, West Riding of Yorkshire, where he attended Ermysted's Grammar School for boys. He has appeared in The Full Monty as well as many other films and TV series. He is best known for playing Bert Atkinson in EastEnders from 2006 to 2007 and in 2017.

TV and filmography

 Man of Straw - Napoleon Fischer
The Sweeney (1976, TV series) - Shaylor
The Duellists (1977) - Cuirassier
 Going Straight ep3.(1978)
Oppenheimer (1980, TV mini-series) - James Tuck
Britannia Hospital (1982) - Jeff
The Draughtsman's Contract (1982) - Mr Herbert / Mrs Herbert's husband
Remembrance (1982) - Paul
Invitation to the Wedding (1985) - Higson
Turtle Diary (1985) - taxi driver (uncredited)
Car Trouble (1986) - Bill
The Nature of the Beast (1988) - Oggy
The Raggedy Rawney (1988) - Lamb
The Most Dangerous Man in the World (1988) - Ahmet
Georg Elser - Einer aus Deutschland (1989) - Precinct Chief
All Creatures Great and Small (1989, TV series) - Bert Longshaw
The Bill (1989-2005, TV series) - Sgt Harry Haynes / Harry Fletcher / William Hanley / B.T.P.C. Reighson /  Mr. Edge
Harry Enfield's Television Programme (1990, TV series) - Freddie
In Fading Light (1991) - Alfie Olsen
Grange Hill (1991, TV series) - Steven Farrington-Booth
Heartbeat (1993, TV series) - Eric Bradshaw
London's Burning (1993, TV series) - Charlie Ross
Pie in the Sky (1994, TV series) - Brian Perkins
Mike and Angelo (1994, TV series) - Ralph Dimpey
Paradise (1994, TV series) - Joseph
Seaforth (1994, TV mini-series) - Andy
Peak Practice (1995, TV series) - Phil Cullman
Game On (1995, TV series) - Ron Grimshaw
Cracker (1995, TV series) - Mr. Franklin
Circles of Deceit (1995, TV movie) - Andy
When Saturday Comes (1996) - Fred
Chef! (1996, TV series) - Cyril Bryson
Black Eyes (1996) - Security Guard
The Ice House (1997, TV mini-series) - Fred Phillips
Dalziel and Pascoe (1997, TV series) - Arnie Bancroft
The Full Monty (1997) - Alan
Swept from the Sea (1997) - Jack Vincent
City Central (1998-2000, TV series) - PC Pete Redfern
Take a Girl Like You (2000) - Mr. Bunn
There's Only One Jimmy Grimble (2000) - United Scout
The Gentleman Thief (2001, TV movie) - Frank Banning
Bob & Rose (2001, TV movie) - Trevor Gadds
Linda Green (2001–2002, TV series) - Frank Green
In Denial of Murder (2004, TV movie) - Norman Taylor
My Life as a Popat (2004, TV series) - Alf Saviour
Bad Girls (2005, TV series) - Ron
Rocket Man (2005, TV mini-series) - Huw Masters
New Tricks (2006, TV series) - Brendan Dyer
EastEnders (2006–07, 2017, soap opera) - Bert Atkinson
Place of Execution (2008, TV mini-series) - Old Tommy Clough
Doc Martin (2009, TV series) - Jim Selkirk
Skins (2011-2012, TV series) - Dewi
Sixteen (2013) - Gerry
Vera (2014, TV series) - Larry Crowe
The Mill (2014, TV series) - Abraham Whittaker
Mad Max (2015)
Metal Gear Solid V: The Phantom Pain (2015)
Holby City (2016, TV series) - Sinclair Sheridan
Porridge (2017, TV mini-series) - Joe Lotterby
All Creatures Great and Small (2020, TV series) - Bert Chapman.

References

External links

Living people
English male soap opera actors
Male actors from Yorkshire
People from Skipton
People educated at Ermysted's Grammar School
20th-century English male actors
21st-century English male actors
Year of birth missing (living people)